Mancos is a statutory town in Montezuma County, Colorado, United States. The population was 1,196 at the 2020 census, down from 1,336 in 2010.

The town is in southwestern Colorado, at the base of Mesa Verde National Park, and holds the trademark for "Gateway to Mesa Verde". Surrounded by rangeland and mountains, Mancos offers a variety of outdoor recreational activities. The town was founded in 1894, near the site where early Spanish explorers first crossed the Mancos River. It is the commercial center for east Montezuma County, and was considered at one time as a county seat. It is served by U.S. Highway 160 and State Highway 184.

History

Ancient Pueblo People

The Mancos Valley has been settled since at least the 10th century AD, although various severe conditions in the mid to late 13th century saw the area and its multitude of small villages abandoned by the Ancient Pueblo People (Anasazi). The Mancos area is dotted with inventoried and uninventoried archeological sites, including both isolated houses and shelters and small village complexes. Mancos Valley residents were probably among those who withdrew to the cliff dwellings on Mesa Verde, perhaps for defensive purposes, due to climate change, or as part of concentration policy of possible invaders and occupiers of the region.

Archaeological sites of the Ancient Pueblo period include:
 Bement site, a Colorado State Register of Historic Properties site, representing the first and second Pueblo periods. Between AD 750-850 there was one shelter on the site. About 150 years later, a group of six structures were inhabited from 1000 to 1150.
 Lost Canyon Archeological District, on the National Register of Historic Places, which may have been the northernmost boundary of the Mesa Verde Ancient Pueblo People from about AD 1000-1300.

Native American tribes

Control of the area was contested by nomadic Navajo and Ute people for centuries. Spanish friars and military passed through the area as part of the Old Spanish Trail connecting New Mexico and California in the 18th century. The name "Mancos" comes from the Domínguez–Escalante expedition of 1776, though the reason for the name remains unclear (see below). By some unverified accounts, the name Mancos refers to the crippled nature of the Spanish explorers' horses after they crossed the San Juan Mountains. According to unverified lore, the horses were rejuvenated by the lush green grass in the Mancos Valley. Somewhere in the town is the point at which the expedition crossed the Rio Mancos on its way to California from Old Mexico.

19th and 20th century

The Old Spanish Trail trade route passed through the area of Mancos from 1829 into the 1850s.

Part of the original Ute Reservation in 1868, Mancos was part of the San Juan Cession of 1873, and cattle ranchers began settling the Mancos Valley in the 1870s, providing cattle to the mining camps of the San Juan and La Plata ranges. At the time it was founded, Mancos served as the primary commercial trading center for eastern Montezuma County, rivaling the town of Dolores to the northwest. At that time, Cortez, now the county seat, was barely a bend in the wagon trail. In the 1890s, Mancos was platted and built as a stop along the Rio Grande Southern Railroad built by Otto Mears - Colorado's southwestern railroad pathfinder, connecting Durango to the east and the Telluride mining districts to the north, via Dolores. Ranchers in the Mancos Valley continued to provide beef, timber, and other agricultural products to the mining camps. Following this, Latter-day Saints colonists moved into the area and established farms and small communities such as Weber and Cherry Creek.

Local farmers and ranchers began constructing irrigation canals to bring water from the Mancos River to cropland and pasture in various parts of the Mancos Valley in the late 1870s and 1880s, and by the beginning of the 20th century a large network of irrigation ditches and laterals was operating and continues to operate (with improvements) today. In the mid-2000s, a large project, the Mancos Valley Salinity Control Project, was funded by various sources, including the US Bureau of Reclamation, the Natural Resources Conservation Service, and local irrigation and water companies and districts. The project, nearly complete in 2010, includes replacing many open irrigation ditches with piping to conserve water and prevent salt contamination from infiltration and evaporation of irrigation water. Many of the original irrigation ditches have been determined to be eligible for the National Register of Historic Places, together with various archeological sites.

Incorporated in 1894, Mancos town government quickly asserted itself, banning fast riding and driving (of wagons) in town the next year, as well as building boardwalks. A water system and electrical system were constructed in 1904, followed by a new bridge across the river in 1905 and concrete sidewalks in 1909. However, most side streets of the town remain unpaved. The abandonment of the railroad in the 1950s allowed US 160 to be rerouted to follow the present Railroad Avenue, leaving Grand Avenue, the town's main street, as a business route; an earlier route of US 160 is now County Road J, south of the river and most of the town. The establishment of Mesa Verde National Park also encouraged early growth of Mancos.

Several Mancos sites from about the turn of the 20th century are listed on the state or national register of historic places. The first two are on the Colorado State Register of Historic Properties, the remaining are on the National Register of Historic Places:
 The Bauer Bank Building, built in 1905, is the oldest surviving masonry building in the Mancos Valley.
 The Bauer House was built in 1889 for George Bauer, a Mancos pioneer merchant who built the town's first store in 1881, a banker, and a stonemason.
 Mancos High School, built in 1909 of local sandstone, was the first high school in the county.
 The Mancos Opera House was completed in 1910.
 The Wrightsman House was built in 1903 of late Victorian architecture.

Attempts to create a separate Mancos County from the eastern portion of Montezuma County in the mid-20th century failed. Agricultural development, and to a certain extent, tourism, benefited from the Mancos Project of the US Bureau of Reclamation in the 1950s, which created Jackson Reservoir north of the town, today the site of Mancos State Park. This project also supplies water for the town, a rural water district, and Mesa Verde National Park.

In recent years the growth of Durango has spread to Mancos, making the town something of an art colony. Aramark, the concessionaire for Mesa Verde National Park, has facilities in the town, and there is a specialty aspen sawmill (Western Excelsior) and other small industrial enterprises. Numerous events are held in the town each year, including Mancos Days the last weekend in July, a motorcycle rally over Labor Day weekend, and a balloon festival in September. Much of the farm and ranch land in the Mancos Valley has been subdivided into rural residential and "hobby ranch" properties in recent years, as is happening in much of Montezuma County. Several major subdivisions immediately adjacent to Mancos are in various stages of development and are expected to greatly increase the town's population by 2015, despite some slowdown due to economic conditions. The Mancos Library District constructed a new public library in 2008, located on a former electrical generating station site south of the Mancos River. Most recent new businesses and business activity are occurring outside the corporate limits of the town, in Montezuma County jurisdiction. In 2007-2010, there have been numerous controversial approvals of new commercial developments, including mail-order firms, sand and gravel pits, ready-mix plants and hot-mix asphalt facilities, by the Montezuma County Board of County Commissioners.

Geography

Mancos is located in eastern Montezuma County at  (37.345420, -108.292412).

The Mancos River was named by Spanish explorers (Rio de los Mancos - "River of the Sleeve") perhaps for the way the river, which rises in the La Plata Mountains northeast of Mancos, drains the valley and then flows into the narrow confines of Weber Canyon and Mancos Canyon, southwest of Mesa Verde, where it joins the San Juan River. The town's skyline is dominated by the mass of Mesa Verde  to the west, Menefee Mountain   to the southeast, and the La Plata Mountains, a range to the east and northeast, in which the headwaters of the Mancos River originate.

Originally laid out as a railroad town, Mancos stretches for approximately a mile along the river and on both sides of it, while newer areas lie north of the old railroad alignment (now U.S. Route 160, part of the San Juan Skyway and the Old Spanish Trail). The small main business district lies along Business Route 160 (Grand Avenue), while newer business areas are located along the main highway. The highly publicized death of a schoolchild in 2003 led to a major reconstruction of US 160 through the town in following years, creating a street pattern which somewhat hampers development. US 160 leads west  to Cortez, the Montezuma county seat, and east  to Durango. Colorado State Highway 184 leads northwest from Mancos  to Dolores.

The Mancos River flows from east to west through the town, and then flows to the south into Mancos Canyon, on the west and south toe of Mesa Verde. Much of the townsite is located in a Special Flood Hazard Area (the 100-year floodplain)), including most bridges connecting the two parts of the town.

 northeast of town is Mancos State Park located on Jackson Gulch Reservoir, built by the Mancos Irrigation Project. Echo Basin, a winter (Nordic) skiing area and various vacation resorts and dude ranches, as well as an elk ranch and other tourist-, sports-, and hunting-related activities are located in and around the town.

As is common in Colorado, many government services are provided by special districts, both inside the corporate limits of the town of Mancos and outside in the county. Among these are the Mancos Library District, Mancos Water Conservancy District and Mancos Fire Protection District (which also provides emergency medical services). The town does have a medical clinic, funded through a variety of private and public sources.

There are a few private airstrips in the vicinity of Mancos, but these are not open to the public; a former town airfield near Jackson Gulch Reservoir is sometimes still marked on maps.

Demographics

2020 census

As of the 2020 census, there were 1,196 people residing in the town.

2010 census
As of the census of 2010, there were 1,336 people, 546 households, and 320 families residing in the town. The racial makeup was 1,141 (85.4%) White, 1 (0.1%) Black or African American, 84 (6.3%) Native American, 9 (0.7%) Asian, 4 (0.3%) Pacific Islander, 56 (4.2%) from other races, and 41 (3.1%) from two or more races. There were 164 (12.3%) of Hispanic or Latino ancestry, of any race.

1,263 people (94.5% of the population) lived in households, 73 (5.5%) lived in non-institutionalized group quarters, and none were institutionalized.

There were 546 households, out of which 191 (35.0%) had children under the age of 18 living with them, 209 (38.3%) were opposite-sex married couples living together, 44 (8.1%) unmarried opposite-sex partnerships, and 3 (0.5%) same-sex married couples or partnerships. 81 (14.8%) had a female householder with no husband present, and 30 (5.5%) had a male householder with no wife present. 226 (14.4%) were non-families. 184 (33.7%) of all households were made up of individuals, and 66 (12.1%) had someone living alone who was 65 years of age or older. The average household size was 2.31 and the average family size was 3.01.

In the town, the population was spread out, with 356 (26.6%) under the age of 18, 67 (5.0%) aged 18 to 24, 363 (27.2%) aged 25 to 44, 341 (25.5%) aged 45 to 64, and 209 (15.6%) who were 65 years of age or older. The median age was 38 years. For every 100 females, there were 87.9 males. For every 100 females age 18 and over, there were 81.8 males.

2000 census
As of the census of 2000, there were 1,119 people, 478 households, and 292 families residing in the town. The racial makeup of the town was 88.65% White, 2.23% Native American, 0.09% Pacific Islander, 7.86% from other races, and 1.16% from two or more races. Hispanic or Latino of any race were 12.42% of the population.

There were 478 households, out of which 32.0% had children under the age of 18 living with them, 43.7% were married couples living together, 13.2% had a female householder with no husband present, and 38.9% were non-families. 33.7% of all households were made up of individuals, and 13.2% had someone living alone who was 65 years of age or older. The average household size was 2.31 and the average family size was 2.93.

In the town, the population was spread out, with 25.8% under the age of 18, 9.0% from 18 to 24, 26.1% from 25 to 44, 25.5% from 45 to 64, and 13.6% who were 65 years of age or older. The median age was 38 years. For every 100 females, there were 93.6 males. For every 100 females age 18 and over, there were 89.5 males.

The median income for a household in the town was $25,223, and the median income for a family was $32,188. Males had a median income of $27,708 versus $17,292 for females. The per capita income for the town was $13,946. About 11.8% of families and 16.1% of the population were below the poverty line, including 22.5% of those under age 18 and 15.5% of those age 65 or over.

Transportation
Mancos is part of Colorado's Bustang network. It is on the Durango-Grand Junction Outrider line.

Notable people

Luther Elliss, former NFL Pro Bowl defensive end
Jaye P. Morgan, retired singer, born in Mancos in 1931
Louisa Wade Wetherill, explorer and trader

See also

Outline of Colorado
Index of Colorado-related articles
State of Colorado
Colorado cities and towns
Colorado municipalities
Colorado counties
Montezuma County, Colorado
Mesa Verde National Park and UNESCO World Heritage Site
Old Spanish National Historic Trail

References

External links
Town of Mancos official website
Mancos School District
Mancos Public Library
Mancos Water Conservancy District

Towns in Montezuma County, Colorado
Old Spanish Trail (trade route)
Towns in Colorado